Falco antiquus is an extinct species of falcon lived during the Middle Pleistocene in southern Europe. It is thought to be the common ancestor of modern gyrfalcons and saker falcons.

References

Pleistocene birds
Falco (genus)